Apolephthisa is a genus of flies belonging to the family Mycetophilidae.

The species of this genus are found in Europe, Russia and Northern America.

Species:
 Apolephthisa bulunensis Blagoderov & Grimaldi, 2004 
 Apolephthisa mesozoica Blagoderov, 1998

References

Mycetophilidae